The Chinese Ambassador to the Democratic Republic of the Congo is the official representative of the People's Republic of China to the Democratic Republic of the Congo.

List of representatives

References 

 
Democratic Republic of the Congo
China